Hymenocallis phalangidis is a species of spider lily known only from the Mexican state of Nayarit.

References

phalangidis
Plants described in 1989
Flora of Nayarit